ISO 55001 Asset management – Management systems – Requirements is a standard developed for the use of people or organizations involved in asset management. This standard was developed by ISO technical committee ISO/TC 251. ISO 55001 was published for the first time in January 2014.

Main requirements of the standard 
The ISO 55001:2014 adopts the "ISO High Level Structure (HLS)" in 10 chapters in the following breakdown:
 1 Purpose
 2 Reference standards
 3 Terms and definitions
 4 Organization context
 5 Leadership
 6 Planning
 7 Support
 8 Operating Activities
 9 Performance Evaluation
 10 Improvement

See also 
 List of ISO standards
 Conformity assessment
 International Organization for Standardization

References

External links 
  ISO 55001—Asset management — Management systems — Requirements
 ISO TC 251—Asset management

55001